Anne Elizabeth Longfield  (born 1960) is a campaigner for children who formerly served as the Children's Commissioner for England. She was formerly chief executive of the charity 4Children. She was appointed the Children's Commissioner for England in March 2015 and was succeeded at the end of February 2021 by Dame Rachel de Souza.

Early life and career
Longfield was born to mother Jean, who was from a farming family, and father Vincent, an engineer who worked on Concorde. She grew up on a farm on The Chevin near Otley, West Yorkshire, and was educated at Prince Henry's Grammar School, Otley and Newcastle University, where she studied history.

Longfield started working in the children's sector in the 1980s as a researcher with Save the Children. She subsequently served as Chief Executive of Kids Clubs Network. Prior to her appointment as Children's Commissioner, Longfield was Chief Executive of 4Children, a leading national children's charity, which delivered early years support, school support and youth services. She held this role for over 20 years. Whilst there she oversaw the huge and rapid expansion of the charity - from employing six people to 1,500 members of staff - and left just before its financial collapse. During her time with 4Children, she worked with Labour minister Harriet Harman on developing Sure Start, and spent a year on secondment at the Prime Minister's Strategy Unit to assist with the programme's delivery.

Children's Commissioner
Over her time in office the Longfield worked on issues affecting children's mental health, put forward proposals for giving children more power over their digital lives, published research on the experience of children in care, and launched a long-term study and data index on vulnerable children invisible to the state. Under these main areas of research she has made many public interventions, and published a large number of detailed reports exploring, explaining and advocating various solutions to specific aspects of these subjects. She has seen a number of them put into place by Government.

Longfield has made many appearances in print and on broadcast media, and has made representations to local and national Government. She has created a digital platform for Children in Care, IMO. Her helpline “Help at Hand”, which aims to address problems raised by children in care, helps around a thousand children a year.

In 2020 her office responded to the coronavirus pandemic by producing materials to explain the virus and lockdown to children and highlighting the impact of the crisis on children - especially vulnerable children.  She campaigned since May 2020 for all schools to be open in September, saying that, in any further restrictions to curb the spread of COVID-19, schools should be “last to close and first to re-open".

Longfield was appointed Officer of the Order of the British Empire (OBE) in 2000 and Commander of the Order of the British Empire (CBE) in the 2021 Birthday Honours for services to children.

Views
Longfield is concerned about what she sees as the effect of benefit cuts on vulnerable children in low income families. Longfield stated that universal credit and wider welfare reforms disproportionately affect single parents.  Longfield stated, “There is a great risk here that the government looks like it’s going back to an outdated… viewpoint which is demonising both single parents but also families claiming benefit, and working mothers.”

She has argued for large digital platforms that are used by children to have greater responsibility and response to complaints from child users and has called for legislation in England to tackle perceived reluctance on such platforms to do so.

She has stated that waiting times and coverage of children's mental health services are too long, and insufficient for need.

She has called for review and overhaul of children's services across England and a much more “joined up approach” to providing services that prevent the need for greater intervention at a later stage in a child's life.

She believes there should be a register of children home educated in England.

She has called for greater co-ordination of police, the justice system, NHSE and children's services to tackle gang involvement, violent knife crime and the distribution of illegal drugs known as “county lines”. She has said “No child should ever end up as a headline about gangland murder or organized exploitation simply because nobody in the system thought it was their job to keep them safe.”

Criticism

In 2015, shortly after starting her new role as children's Commissioner, Longfield was criticised for removing her Deputy, Sue Berelowitz, with an enhanced severance package, and then immediately hiring her back as a consultant. It transpired that this had taken place without securing the required approval from government ministers and was therefore an abuse of her powers. The arrangement was subsequently cancelled as a result of media attention and the organisation ordered her to repay to HM Treasury £10,000 of misused public funds.

Personal life
After 20 years of living in London, Longfield and her husband Richard Reeve, a graphic designer, moved to her native West Yorkshire in 2003, settling in Ilkley. The couple have a son, Oliver, who has embarked on a career as a chef.

References 

Living people
Commanders of the Order of the British Empire
Children's rights in the United Kingdom
Children's Commissioners for England
1960 births
British chief executives
Women chief executives
People educated at Prince Henry's Grammar School, Otley
People from Otley
Alumni of Newcastle University